An online encyclopedia, also called an Internet encyclopedia, is a digital encyclopedia accessible through the Internet. Examples include Wikipedia and Encyclopædia Britannica.

Digitization of old content

In January 1995, Project Gutenberg started to publish the ASCII text of the Encyclopædia Britannica, 11th edition (1911), but disagreement about the method halted the work after the first volume. For trademark reasons this has been published as the Gutenberg Encyclopedia.  Project Gutenberg later restarted work on digitising and proofreading this encyclopedia.  Project Gutenberg has published volumes in alphabetic order; the most recent publication is Volume 17 Slice 8: Matter–Mecklenburg published on 7 April 2013.  The latest Britannica was digitized by its publishers, and sold first as a CD-ROM, and later as an online service.

In 2001, ASCII text of all 28 volumes was published on Encyclopædia Britannica Eleventh Edition by source; a copyright claim was added to the materials included. The website no longer exists.

Other digitization projects have made progress in other titles.  One example is Easton's Bible Dictionary (1897) digitized by the Christian Classics Ethereal Library.

A successful digitization of an encyclopedia was the Bartleby Project's online adaptation of the Columbia Encyclopedia, Sixth Edition, in early 2000 and is updated periodically.

Other websites provide online encyclopedias, some of which are also available on Wikisource, but which may be more complete than those on Wikisource, or maybe different editions (see List of online encyclopedias).

Creation of new content

Another related branch of activity is the creation of new, free content on a volunteer basis. In 1991, the participants of the Usenet newsgroup  started a project to produce a real version of The Hitchhiker's Guide to the Galaxy, a fictional encyclopedia used in the works of Douglas Adams. It became known as Project Galactic Guide. Although it originally aimed to contain only real, factual articles, the policy was changed to allow and encourage semi-real and unreal articles as well. Project Galactic Guide contains over 1700 articles, but no new articles have been added since 2000; this is probably partly due to the founding of h2g2, a more official project along similar lines.

The 1993 Interpedia proposal was planned as an encyclopedia on the Internet to which everyone could contribute materials. The project never left the planning stage and was overtaken by a key branch of old printed encyclopedias.

Another early online encyclopedia was called the Global Encyclopedia. In November 1995 a review of it was presented by James Rettig (Assistant Dean of University Libraries for Reference and Information Services) College of William & Mary at the 15th Annual Charleston Conference on library acquisitions and related issues. He said of the Global Encyclopedia:

He then gives several examples of article entries such as Iowa City:

Wikipedia is a free content, multilingual online encyclopedia written and maintained by a community of volunteer contributors through a model of open collaboration. It is the largest and most-read reference work in history, Wikipedia originally developed from another encyclopedia project called Nupedia.

See also
 Digital library
 List of online encyclopedias
 Reference software

References

External links

 

Internet